An azasteroid is a type of steroid derivative which has one of the carbon atoms in the steroid ring system replaced by a nitrogen atom. Two azasteroids, finasteride and dutasteride, are used clinically as 5α-reductase inhibitors. 

Some of the 6-azasteroids may prove to be useful drugs, but have yet to reach the pharmaceutical market.

References

Steroids